Stenostola unicolor is a species of beetle in the family Cerambycidae. It was described by Kono in 1933. It is known from Japan. It feeds on Pterocarya rhoifolia and Magnolia obovata.

References

Saperdini
Beetles described in 1933